The Tournament of Champions  was a prominent professional tennis tournament series held at the West Side Tennis Club in Forest Hills, N.Y. and at Kooyong Stadium, Melbourne and White City Stadium, Sydney in Australia in 1957, 1958, and 1959.

History
The tournaments were held on the grass courts of Forest Hills, New York, at West Side Tennis Club between 1957 and 1959, and Australian versions were held on grass courts at White City Stadium, Sydney 1957, at Kooyong Stadium in Melbourne in 1958, and at White City again in 1959. The 1957 and 1958  Forest Hills tournaments were both a round robin format, while the 1959 Forest Hills tournament was an elimination format with 10 players. The 1958 Kooyong Tournament of Champions was a round robin format, while the 1957 and 1959 White City, Sydney tournaments were an elimination format.

The 1958 Kooyoong Tournament of Champions, with 10,000 AUS£ prize money, was the richest tournament of the series.

The 1957 Forest Hills Tournament of Champions was broadcast live nationally in the U.S. on the CBS television network with complete  broadcast coverage, the only professional tournament in the U.S. known to achieve this status prior to the Open Era. (The 1965 CBS Dallas pro tennis tournament was filmed and broadcast one match at a time as a weekly series.) The Forest Hills Tournament of Champions in 1957, 1958, and 1959 all featured a Pancho Gonzales vs. Lew Hoad singles match on the final day. The 1959 Forest Hills Tournament of Champions offered the largest winners' cheques of the year. The current designation by the West Side Tennis Club of the 1957-59 Forest Hills TOC is "WCT Tournament of Champions". Kramer's contemporary brochures described the Ampol series, of which the 1959 Forest Hills TOC was a part, with the term "World Championship Tennis".

Sponsors
The Australian Tournament of Champions (TOC) was sponsored by Ampol Petroleum as the Ampol Tournament of Champions. The prize money for the 1957 Sydney TOC was 7,500 AUS£, for the 1958 Kooyong TOC it was 10,000 AUS£, and for the 1959 Sydney TOC it was 5,000 AUS£.

Singles

Forest Hills Tournament of Champions

Australian Tournament of Champions

Draws

Forest Hills 1957

Sources

Forest Hills 1958

Sources

Forest Hills 1959

See also
Major professional tennis tournaments before the Open Era

References

Sources

 

Sports competitions in New York City
Defunct tennis tournaments in the United States
Recurring sporting events established in 1956
Recurring events disestablished in 1968
Professional tennis tournaments before the Open Era
Grass court tennis tournaments
Defunct tennis tournaments in Australia